Soseono (66/7 – 6 BCE) or Yeon Soseono was the second wife of King Dongmyeong and a key figure in the establishment of both Goguryeo and Baekje. She was the mother of Biryu and Onjo, whom they were her sons from her first marriage with Wutae.

Establishing of two kingdoms 
A traditional account from the Annals of Baekje section in the Samguk Sagi, states that Soseono was the daughter of Yeon Ta-bal, a wealthy influential figure in Jolbon and married to Jumong. However, the same source officially states that the chief of Habaek tribe gave his daughter to Jumong, who had fled Eastern Buyeo with his followers, in marriage. According to the Samguk Sagi, Jumong was Lady Soseono's second husband. Her first husband was Wutae.

After Jumong's son, Yuri of Goguryeo, and Yuri's mother, Ye So-ya, who were both presumed to have died, returned to Goguryeo, Yuri became the crown prince of Goguryeo.
Soseono left Goguryeo, taking her two sons Biryu and Onjo south to found their own kingdom, Baekje.

Death
According to the Samguk Sagi, Soseono died in 6 BCE at the age of 61 during the 13th years reign of her second son as the first king of Baekje.

In popular culture
 Portrayed by Han Hye-jin in the 2006–2007 MBC TV series Jumong.
 Portrayed by Jung Ae-ri in the 2010–2011 KBS1 TV series The King of Legend.
Portrayed by Woo Da Young in the 2017 KBS TV series Chronicles of Korea.

Notes

References
Kim Bu-sik: Samguk Sagi, volume 23, "Annals of Baekje," chapter 1; King Onjo.

Goguryeo
Baekje
6 BC deaths
Year of birth unknown
Korean royal consorts
Ancient queens consort
1st-century BC women